(born December 14, 1964) is a Japanese singer, composer, lyricist, music arranger, guitarist and producer. In the end of 1980s and early 1990s, he recorded some successful records which were produced by Todd Rundgren. He has contributed to the works of many musicians, such as Towa Tei and Ryuichi Sakamoto.

Discography

Studio albums

Compilations

Live album

External links
 Artist profile by Official Site "HAAS"
    Hiroshi Takano's MySpace 
 Official Site for Natalie Wise (Japanese)
 Official Site for Ganga Zumba (Japanese)

1964 births
Japanese composers
Japanese male composers
Japanese male musicians
Japanese male singer-songwriters
Japanese singer-songwriters
Japanese music arrangers
Living people
Musicians from Shizuoka Prefecture
Osaka University of Arts alumni